The  is a group of middle Kofun period burial tumuli located in the Rokusei neighborhood of the town of Nakanoto, Ishikawa in the Hokuriku region of Japan. The site was designated a National Historic Site of Japan in 1982.

Overview

The Amenomiya Kofun Group consists of 36 ancient tombs dating from the middle of the 4th century to the beginning of the 5th century centered on Mount Bijo-san, a 188-meter hill in Nakanoto. 

Tomb No.1, located on the highest elevation is the largest "two conjoined rectangles" type tumulus in Ishikawa Prefecture, with an overall length of 64 meters. The posterior is 43.6 meters long by 8.5 meters high and the anterior is 31 meters long. It was made by partially cutting away a natural hill, and by using two different types of soil in alternate layers for strength and stability. It is a two-stage tumulus and was covered with fukiishi. These fukiishi are in three sizes, with larger stones 40 to 60 centimeters used in the bottom tier, smaller stones 2 to 30 centimeters in the upper tier, and smallest stones (10 centimeters) as filler in-between the larger stones. The stones are in a variety of materials, some of which can only be found at considerable distances from the site. Two burial facilities were confirmed on the flat surface at the posterior top. The first is located approximately in the center, and the second burial facility is located to the west of it. The burial chamber contained a split bamboo-shaped wooden coffin that was 6.2 meters long and 80 centimeters wide with a rope hook on both the lid and the body. There is evidence that it was robbed in antiquity; however, some remaining grave goods  included a bronze mirror, 165 metal artifacts, 34 jade beads, and fragments of lacquerware and pottery. These artifacts were collectively designated an Important Cultural Property of Japan in 2008. The second burial chamber is made of andesite stone slabs, but has not been opened. A portion of the tumulus was damaged by the 2007 Noto earthquake.

Tomb No.2 is a round keyhole-shaped tumulus, having one square end and one circular end, located to the northeast of Tomb No.1. It has an overall length of 65 meters, with a circular portion 42 meters in diameter, and the width of the rectangular port of 28 meters, narrowing in 25.5 meter where the two portions join. It also has two tier construction and uses fukiishi. There is no evidence of tampering,  and it is possible that the burial chamber is intact; it has not been excavated. The other tumuli in the cluster are mostly smaller circular-type.

Per the Ishikawa Archaeological Society, the tumuli are as follows:

 
It is located about 30 minutes by car from Notobe Station on the JR West Nanao Line.

Gallery

See also
List of Historic Sites of Japan (Ishikawa)

References

External links

 Ishikawa Prefectural information home page 
Nakanoto town home page 

Kofun
History of Ishikawa Prefecture
Nakanoto, Ishikawa
Historic Sites of Japan
Archaeological sites in Japan
Important Cultural Properties of Japan